Keith Bromage (born 8 November 1937) is a former Australian rules footballer. He played with Collingwood and Fitzroy in his Victorian Football League (VFL) career.

When he debuted against Richmond in 1953 at 15 years of age and 287 days, he was thought to be the youngest debutant in the history of the game.

From 1962 to 1965 he was captain-coach of Manuka Football Club in Canberra.

In 1968, while playing for Dimboola, he was the leading goal-kicker for the Wimmera Football League.

References

External links

1937 births
Living people
Australian rules footballers from Victoria (Australia)
Collingwood Football Club players
Fitzroy Football Club players
Dimboola Football Club players
Manuka Football Club players